(Main list of acronyms)



XA 
 XAF – (s) BEAC (Banque des états de l'Afrique centrale) Central Africa CFA (Coopération financière en Afrique centrale) franc (ISO 4217 currency code)
 XAG – (s) Silver Troy ounce (ISO 4217 currency code)
 XAU – (s) Gold Troy ounce (ISO 4217 currency code)

XB 
 XBA – (s) European Composite Unit (EURCO; Bonds market unit) (ISO 4217 currency code)
 XBB – (s) European Monetary Unit (E.M.U.; Bonds market unit) (ISO 4217 currency code)
 XBML – (p) eXtended Business Modelling Language

XC 
 XC – (s) Ninety (in Roman numerals)
 XCBL – (i) XML Common Business Library
 XCD – (s) East Caribbean dollar (ISO 4217 currency code)

XD 
 XD – Used in chatrooms or email for smiley face. X is the eyes; squinted D is the mouth; XD.

XE 
 Xe – (s) Xenon

XF 
XF
(s) Automobile made by Jaguar
(s) Truck made by DAF Trucks
(p) IATA code for Vladivostok Air
XFA – (i) XML Forms Architecture
XFC – (i) Xtreme Fighting Championships
XFD – (s) Fighter aircraft made by Douglas
Xfe – (i) X File Explorer
XFF – (i) X-Forwarded-For
XFG – (p) Exfoliation glaucoma
XFH
(s) 1932 prototype U.S. Navy fighter aircraft made by Hall 
(i) X-ray fluorescence holography
XFN
(i) XHTML Friends Network
(p) IATA code for Xiangyang Liuji Airport
XFR – (s) Automobile made by Jaguar
XFT – (p) X FreeType interface library
XFW – (p) IATA code for Hamburg Finkenwerder Airport

XG 
XG – (s) Automobile made by Hyundai
XGA – (p) Extended Graphics Array
XGE
(i) Xoreax Grid Engine
(s) Signal for "I Surrender"
XGG – (p) IATA code for Gorom Gorom Airport
XGN – (p) IATA code for Xangongo Airport
XGP – (p) Extreme Game Player
XGR – (p) IATA code for Kangiqsualujjuag (Georges River) Airport

XH 
 xh – (s) Xhosa language (ISO 639-1 code)
 xho – (s) Xhosa language (ISO 639-2 code)
 XHTML – (p) eXtensible Hypertext Markup Language
 XHR – (p) eXtra high Image resolution – XMLHTTPRequest

XI 
 XI – (s) Eleven (in Roman numerals)
 XII – (s) Twelve (in Roman numerals)
 XIII – (s) Thirteen (in Roman numerals)
 XIV – (s) Fourteen (in Roman numerals)
 XIX – (s) Nineteen (in Roman numerals)

XJ 
XJ
(s) Automobile made by Jaguar 
(s) Automobile made by Jeep 
XJL
(s) Amphibian aircraft made by Columbia
(s) Automobile made by Jaguar
XJS – (s) Automobile made by Jaguar

XK 
XK
(s) Automobile made by Jaguar
(s) Automobile made by Jeep
(s) Kell blood group precursor
XKA – (p) IATA code for Kantchari Airport
XKB – (p) X keyboard extension
XKE – (s) Automobile made by Jaguar
XKH – (p) IATA code for Xieng Khouang Airport
XKR – (s) Automobile made by Jaguar
XKS – (p) IATA code for Kasabonika Airport
XKY – (p) IATA code for Kaya Airport

XL 
 XL
(p) eXtra Large
(s) Forty (in Roman numerals)

XM 
 XML – (p) eXtensible Markup Language
 XMSF – (p) eXtensible Modelling and Simulation Framework

XN 
XN – (s) Christian – (s) Nordic Patent Institute
XNA
(p) IATA code for Northwest Arkansas Regional Airport
(i) X-No-Archive
(i) Xeno Nucleic Acid
XNC – (i) X Northern Captain
XNN – (p) IATA code for Xining Caojiabao Airport
XNS
(i) Xerox Network Systems
(p) Extensible Name Service
(s) Christians
XNU – (p) X is Not Unix

XO 
 XO
(i) Χριστιανός Ορθόδοξος (Xristianos Orthodoksos, Greek for "Eastern Orthodoxy")
(p) eXecutive Officer
eXtra Old (brandy grade)
 XOF – (s) BCÉAO (Banque centrale des états de l'Afrique de l'Ouest) West African CFA (Communauté financière d'Afrique) franc (ISO 4217 currency code)

XP 
 XP – (p) eXperience Point (role-playing games)
 XPD – (s) Palladium Troy ounce (ISO 4217 currency code)
 XPF – (s) CFP franc (ISO 4217 currency code)
 XPT – (s) Platinum Troy ounce (ISO 4217 currency code)

XQ 
XQJ – (p) XQuery API for Java™
XQP – (p) IATA code for Quepos La Managua Airport
XQU – (p) IATA code for Qualicum Beach Airport

XR 
 XRML – (p) eXtensible Rights Markup Language
 XRP – (s) a cryptocurrency

XS 
 XS – (i) Xiaolin Showdown -(s) Extra Small
 XSL – (p) eXtensible Style Language

XT 
 XTMH – eXtreme Technology Multiprocessor Hyperlanguage

XU 
 XUL – (p) XML User Interface Language

XV 
 XV – (s) Fifteen (in Roman numerals)
 XVA – an X-Value Adjustment (in finance)
 XVI – (s) Sixteen (in Roman numerals)
 XVII – (s) Seventeen (in Roman numerals)
 XVIII – (s) Eighteen (in Roman numerals)

XW 
XWB – (p) (Airbus A350) "Extra Wide Body"
XWF – (i) Xcitement Wrestling Federation
XWM – (i) X window manager
XWN – (p) eXtended WordNet
XWS – (i) X Window System

XX 
 XX – (s) Twenty (in Roman numerals)
 XXX – (s) Hardcore pornography (film rating) – Thirty (in Roman numerals)

XY 
XYA – (p) IATA code for Yandina Airport
Xyl – (s) Xylobium

XZ 
XZA – (p) IATA code for Zabré Airport
XZN – (s) Triple square screw driver

Acronyms X